Ch'iyar Jaqhi (Aymara ch'iyara black, jaqhi precipice, cliff, "black cliff", hispanicized spelling Chiaraque) is a mountain in the Andes of southern Peru, about  high. It is located on the border of the Moquegua Region, General Sánchez Cerro Province, Ichuña District, and the Puno Region, Puno Province, Pichacani District. Ch'iyar Jaqhi lies southeast of Qayqu.

References

Mountains of Moquegua Region
Mountains of Puno Region
Mountains of Peru